Ray O'Brien (born 21 May 1951) is an Irish former professional footballer.

Early life
O'Brien was born in Dublin.

Career

O'brien began his career with Shelbourne before transferring to Manchester United.

He was then transferred to Notts County F.C. in 1974 for £45,000 without making the first team at Old Trafford.

At Meadow Lane he created a club record in 1979–80 when he became the first full back to finish as leading scorer. He spent ten years at County making over 300 Football League appearances.

He also won four caps for the Republic of Ireland national football team, making his debut on 24 March 1976 in a 3–0 home win over Norway in a friendly game.

He later managed non-League clubs including Boston United and Arnold Town.

His brother Fran O'Brien also played for his country.

References

Sources
The Complete Who's Who of Irish International Football, 1945-96 (1996):Stephen McGarrigle

Gifted in Green, Adam Ward, 1999. PB  p. 23

External links

1951 births
Living people
Association footballers from County Dublin
Republic of Ireland association footballers
Republic of Ireland international footballers
Republic of Ireland under-23 international footballers
League of Ireland players
Shelbourne F.C. players
Manchester United F.C. players
Notts County F.C. players
Republic of Ireland football managers
Boston United F.C. managers
Arnold Town F.C. managers
Association football defenders